James Lee Malone (March 14, 1908 – April 10, 1979) was an American college football coach. He was the first head football coach at Northeast Louisiana State College—now known as the University of Louisiana at Monroe—serving for three seasons, from 1934 to 1953. He later worked for a life insurance company at Baton Rouge upon resigning from his post at Northeast Louisiana. Malone Stadium at Monroe was named after him.

Malone was an alumnus of Louisiana State University (LSU), where he had played football and also coached the freshman football team in 1933. He was married to Marjorie Foster Malone. He died in 1979. Marjorie died in 2010.

Head coaching record

References

External links
 

1908 births
1979 deaths
American football guards
American football tackles
Louisiana–Monroe Warhawks athletic directors
Louisiana–Monroe Warhawks football coaches
LSU Tigers football coaches
LSU Tigers football players
Junior college football coaches in the United States
People from Reform, Alabama
Coaches of American football from Alabama
Players of American football from Alabama